Minuscule 511 (in the Gregory-Aland numbering), ε 342 (in the Soden numbering), is a Greek minuscule manuscript of the New Testament, on paper. Palaeographically it has been assigned to the 13th century. Scrivener labelled it by number 497. The manuscript is lacunose, marginalia are complete. It was adapted for liturgical use.

Description 

The codex contains the complete text of the four Gospels on 337 paper leaves (size ) with some lacunae (Matthew 1:1-18:9; 24:22-44; Mark 14:13-16:20; Luke 1:1-7:5; John 15:15-25; 21:13-25). All lacunae were supplemented by a later hand (15th century). It is written in one column per page, 19-21 lines per page.

There is also a division according to the Ammonian Sections (in Mark 233 Sections – last Section in 16:9), with references Eusebian Canons.

Text 

The Greek text of the codex is a representative of the Byzantine text-type. Hermann von Soden included it to the textual family Kr. Aland placed it in Category V.
According to the Claremont Profile Method it represents Kr in Luke 1 and belongs to the textual cluster 147. In Luke 10 and Luke 20 it creates cluster with 1442.

History 

The manuscript is dated by the INTF to the 13th century.

In 1727 the manuscript came from Constantinople to England and was presented to archbishop of Canterbury, William Wake, together with minuscules 73, 74, 506-520. Wake presented it to the Christ Church College in Oxford. C. R. Gregory saw it in 1883.

The manuscript was added to the list of New Testament minuscule manuscripts by F. H. A. Scrivener (497) and C. R. Gregory (511). Gregory saw it in 1883.

It is currently housed at the Christ Church (Wake 27) in Oxford.

See also 

 List of New Testament minuscules
 Biblical manuscript
 Textual criticism

References

Further reading

External links 

Greek New Testament minuscules
13th-century biblical manuscripts